Hakea propinqua is a flowering shrub in the family Proteaceae. It is a common shrub found in heathlands near Sydney. It has sharp, needle-shaped leaves, white unpleasantly scented flowers and large warty fruit.

Description
The leaves are softer and at a smaller angle to the stem than the related Needlebush.

Taxonomy and naming
Hakea propinqua was first formally described in 1825 by Allan Cunningham and the description was published in Geographical Memoirs on New South Wales. The species name is derived from the Latin propinquus, meaning near,  referring to the similarity to Hakea nodosa.

Distribution and habitat
Hakea propinqua grows from coast to ranges on sand or light loam over sandstone in woodland and heath in the Sydney region to the Blue Mountains.

References

propinqua
Flora of New South Wales